Vazhappady K. Ramamurthy or Vazhapadi K. Ramamoorthy (1940 – 22 October 2002) was an Indian trade unionist and politician.

Political career
He was an ardent follower of the late K Kamaraj and E. V. K. Sampath. He belonged to the Vanniyar community.

He served as the President of Tamil Nadu Congress Committee From 1989 to 1994, he was the Youth Congress President of Salem, Tamil Nadu.

Ramamurthy was elected as a member of the Lok Sabha six times and was defeated twice, in 1996 and 1999. He was involved with the International Labour Organization and served as minister of state for Labour with independent charge in the Congress government led by P. V. Narasimha Rao for a brief period in 1991. He quit his ministerial post on the Cauvery issue.

He was president of the TNCC for six years before being replaced in 1996 when he formed the Tamil Nadu unit of the Tiwari Congress. Ramamurthy went back to the Congress but left that party again to form Tamizhaga Rajiv Congress (TRC). He was part of NDA and become Minister of Petroleum and Natural Gas. With the creation of the TRC, he subsequently announced that it would have an alliance with AIADMK in the upcoming Lok Sabha election. A few days later, J. Jayalalitha announced that TRC was entering the AIADMK-led front, although she denied having engineered the split in the Congress Party. In January 2002, after eight years, Ramamurthy merged TRC with Congress.

Ramamurthy was associated with various trade unions and workers' organizations, serving as honorary president of INTUC Tamil Nadu, Founder-President of the International Institute for Non-aligned Studies, Vice-President of INTUC, Tamil Nadu, and founding member and president of Indian National Rural Labour Federation INRLF, a labour union formed for unorganized rural employees.

Tamizhaga Rajiv Congress
Tamizhaga Rajiv Congress was a regional political party in Tamil Nadu, India. TRC was formed when Vazhapadi Ramamurthy split from the Indian National Congress. TRC merged with Congress in 2002.

Electoral records
He was Member of Parliament elected from Tamil Nadu. He was elected to the Lok Sabha as an Indian National Congress candidate from Dharmapuri constituency in 1977 election and from Krishnagiri constituency in 1980 1984, 1989 and 1991 elections. He was elected from Krishnagiri constituency as an Indian National Congress (Indira) candidate in 1980 election. He was elected from Salem constituency as an Independent candidate in 1998 election.

Parliament Committees
1977-79 Member, Committee on Papers Laid on the Table; Member, Business Advisory Committee; Member, Consultative Committee, Ministry of Labour; Deputy Chief Whip, Congress Parliamentary Party, (Indira) [C.P.P.(I)]

1980 Member, Committee on Public Undertakings; Member, Business Advisory Committee; Member, Committee on Privileges; Member, Consultative Committee, Ministry of Labour

1985-87 Chairman, Committee on Public Undertakings;Committee on Public Undertakings

1986-89 Member, Committee on Public Accounts; Member, Consultative Committee, Ministry of Labor

1990 Member, Committee of Privileges, Member, Consultative Committee, Ministry of Labor and Welfare

Personal life
His wife, R Kalaimani, was a retired teacher, and they shared two sons and a daughter. His eldest son, Vazhapadi Rama Suganthan, is an AICC member, INRLF National General Secretary and Chairman of Rajiv Gandhi Vazhapadi K Ramamurthy Charitable trust, while his younger son, Vazhapadi R Karnan, is President of INRLF Tamil Nadu state. 

Ramamurthy died in Chennai on 27 October 2002.

See also
Indian National Congress breakaway parties
Politics of Tamil Nadu

References

Further reading
  Express India – TN Cong crippled as Ramamurthy allies with AIADMK-led front

Indian National Congress politicians from Tamil Nadu
Union Ministers from Tamil Nadu
India MPs 1977–1979
India MPs 1980–1984
India MPs 1984–1989
India MPs 1989–1991
India MPs 1991–1996
India MPs 1998–1999
2002 deaths
Lok Sabha members from Tamil Nadu
People from Dharmapuri district
All India Indira Congress (Tiwari) politicians
People from Krishnagiri district
People from Salem district
1940 births
Assassination of Rajiv Gandhi